Andrej Marinc (born October 4, 1930) is a Slovenian politician and agronomist who served as the president of the executive council of the Socialist Republic of Slovenia from November 27, 1972, to April 1978. He was born in Celje, Slovenia, and was a member of the League of Communists of Slovenia. He was preceded by Stane Kavčič and succeeded by Anton Vratuša.

References

1930 births
Living people
Slovenian politicians

Politicians from Celje